Lake View Cemetery is a historic rural cemetery in the town of Sweden, near Brockport in Monroe County, New York. The cemetery was established in 1891.  It includes a Romanesque Revival style chapel / receiving vault, a small pond, a cast iron tiered fountain, and a distinctive serpentine road system.
The cemetery has more than 5,000 burials. Among the noted burials are actress Nancy Coleman (1912–2000) and US Congressmen Henry W. Seymour (1834–1906) & Richard C. Shannon (1839–1920).

It was listed on the National Register of Historic Places in 2009.

References

External links
 

Brockport, New York
Cemeteries on the National Register of Historic Places in New York (state)
1891 establishments in New York (state)
Cemeteries in Monroe County, New York
National Register of Historic Places in Monroe County, New York
Rural cemeteries